Roger Bullen (18 July 1934 – 25 October 2017) was an Australian rules footballer who played with Geelong in the Victorian Football League (VFL).

Notes

External links 

1934 births
Australian rules footballers from Victoria (Australia)
Geelong Football Club players
Mooroopna Football Club players
2017 deaths